Thaimel Aanai is a 1988 Indian Tamil-language film, directed by L. Raja and produced by M. Saravanan, M. Balasubramanian & M. S. Guhan. The film stars Arjun Sarja and Raghuvaran. The film was a remake of Bengali film Pratikar(1987) which was also remade in Hindi as Pratikar, in Telugu as Raktha Tilakam and in Sinhala as Danduwama. The film was released on 13 April 1988. The film was commercially successful upon release.

Plot
Thaimel Aanai is the story of a son's revenge on the killers of his mother and sister, but his friend, who is now a Police officer, does not like someone taking the law into his hands. In the end, the villains kidnap Vinod's family. Raja storms the hideout of the villains along with Vinod and rescues Vinod's family by fighting with the villains, killing the goons who destroyed his family in the process. But sadly, Raja dies of the injuries he received during the fight. The movie ends with Vinod carrying the corpse of Raja and walking away along with his family.

Cast

Arjun as Raja
Raghuvaran as Vinod
Saroja Devi as Vijaya and Raja's mother
Ranjini as Meena
Madhuri as Vinod's wife
Vani Viswanath as Vijaya
C. L. Anandan
Kishmu as Chakkara
Jai Ganesh as Devaraj
Y. Gee. Mahendra as Punyakodi
Senthil as a fisherman of Rangukuppam 
S. S. Chandran as Picha
K. K. Soundar as Padma's father
Babitha as Padma
Idichapuli Selvaraj as Kannaiyya
Kumarimuthu as a fisherman of Rangukuppam
Omakuchi Narasimhan as a director
Bayilvan Ranganathan as Chakkara's henchman
Kullamani as a fisherman of Rangukuppam
Thavakalai as a fisherman of Rangukuppam
Anandaraj as Johny
Azhagu as Dhilip
Naveen as Chakkara's henchman
Master Meenuraj as Babu
Master Jai Krishna as young Raja
Master Biju as young Vinod
Baby Vijaya as young Vijaya

Production
Thaimel Aanai marks the return in the Tamil cinema of the star B. Saroja Devi, in the 80s.

Soundtrack
The soundtrack consist of nine songs composed by Chandrabose. Among which 2 unpublished works at the time of the release of the soundtrack, "Chinna Kanna Chella Kanna", S. P. Balasubrahmanyam's version and K. S. Chitra's sad version (or slow version). Lyrics were written by Vairamuthu. 2 songs became hits in their taken out, "Vaaika Varabukulla Vayasupulla" and "Hey Mallikai Poo Poothirukku".

Tamil Tracklist

Hindi Tracklist

Reception
The Indian Express wrote, "Like a merry-go-round the film keeps spinning about in a whirl all geared to one end of satisfying the audience in an entertainment made-to-order exercise".

References

External links
 

1988 films
1980s Tamil-language films
Indian action films
AVM Productions films
1980s masala films
1988 action films
Tamil remakes of Bengali films
Films directed by L. Raja